James J. Yacullo (March 14, 1904 –March 31, 1990) was an American lawyer and politician.

Yaculla was born in New York City, New York. In 1911, he moved to Chicago, Illinois. In 1922, he graduated from McKinley High School. He also went to Crane Junior College and DePaul University College of Law. Yacullo was admitted to the Illinois bar, in 1927, and practiced law in Chicago. He also worked as an Illinois Assistant Attorney General. Yaculla served in the Illinois House of Representatives in 1953 and 1954 and was a Republican. Yaculla die at a nursing home in Bloomingdale, Illinois.

Notes

1904 births
1990 deaths
Lawyers from Chicago
Politicians from Chicago
Lawyers from New York City
Politicians from New York City
DePaul University College of Law alumni
Malcolm X College alumni
Republican Party members of the Illinois House of Representatives
20th-century American politicians
20th-century American lawyers